Zygonoides fuelleborni is a species of dragonfly in the family Libellulidae. It is found in Angola, Botswana, Cameroon, the Democratic Republic of the Congo, Kenya, Malawi, Mozambique, Namibia, Nigeria, South Africa, Sudan, Tanzania, Uganda, Zambia, Zimbabwe, and possibly Burundi. Its natural habitats are subtropical or tropical moist lowland forests, subtropical or tropical dry shrubland, subtropical or tropical moist shrubland, and rivers.

References

Libellulidae
Taxonomy articles created by Polbot
Insects described in 1902